Brooklyn Bicycle Company, is a bicycle company based in Williamsburg, Brooklyn, New York, that was founded by Ryan Zagata in 2011, as Brooklyn Cruiser.

Background and founding
Zagata, who had previously worked in the software industry, was inspired to design the bicycles after his move to Brooklyn and subsequent infatuation with the borough left him wanting to explore more of the neighborhood.  The final push to start the company occurred during a trip to Vietnam where he saw utility bicycles being used to transport vast amounts of goods. His first design, the Brooklyn Cruiser, was offered for sale in August 2011, and was deliberately designed to function as a city bicycle for urban everyday use, unlike the off-road mountain bike or the road bicycle. In 2012, CNN named the Brooklyn Cruiser one of "the coolest commutes on two wheels". The company proved very successful, with one million dollar plus revenue projected for 2013. In 2013, two new models were launched titled Franklin and Bedford. Brooklyn Bicycle Co. moved into more versatile models in 2016 with the release of their Lorimer women’s hybrid bike and Roebling men’s hybrid bike. As of 2017, there are eight different collections to choose from.

Design and reception
The bicycles have been showcased as fashionable options in publications such as Vogue where in 2012, a "Willow blue" bike was presented as an ideal match for a Thakoon Panichgul dress. In 2013 a limited edition red Brooklyn Cruiser was selected by the Museum of Modern Art for sale through their shop. The 2013 model, designed in collaboration with Grant Petersen (of Rivendell Bicycle Works) was influenced by Raleigh's 1950s bicycles. In 2016, Bicycle Magazine named the Wythe one of the year's Best City Bikes, and in that same year The Coolist listed the Wythe as one of the Best Commuter Bikes.

See also 
 Cycle chic

References

External links 
 Official website
 

Bicycle framebuilders
2011 establishments in New York City
American companies established in 2011
Companies based in Brooklyn
Manufacturing companies based in New York City
Vehicle manufacturing companies established in 2011
Cycle manufacturers of the United States